The 1970 Coupe de France Final was a football match held at Stade Olympique Yves-du-Manoir, Colombes on May 31, 1970, that saw AS Saint-Étienne defeat FC Nantes 5–0 thanks to goals by Patrick Parizon, Georges Bereta, Robert Herbin and Hervé Revelli.

Match details

See also
Coupe de France 1969-70

External links
Coupe de France results at Rec.Sport.Soccer Statistics Foundation
Report on French federation site

Coupe
1970
Coupe De France Final 1970
Coupe De France Final 1970
Coupe de France Final
Sport in Hauts-de-Seine
Coupe de France Final